Mathieu Ganio (born 16 March 1984) is a French danseur étoile of the Paris Opera Ballet.

Mathieu Ganio was born in Marseille, France, the son of Ballet National de Marseille principal dancers Dominique Khalfouni and Denys Ganio. He began dance lessons at the age of seven and studied at the École Nationale Supérieure de Danse de Marseille from 1992 to 1999, before completing his training at the Paris Opera Ballet School. In 2001 he joined the corps de ballet of the Paris Opera Ballet and won promotion to the rank of coryphée in 2002 and sujet in 2003. On 20 May 2004, following a performance of Don Quixote, he was appointed étoile, bypassing the rank of premier danseur. In 2005 he was awarded the Benois de la Danse as outstanding male dancer.

His younger sister, Marine Ganio, is a sujet of the Paris Opera Ballet.

Repertoire
La Sylphide (choreography: Pierre Lacotte): James
Giselle (choreography: Patrice Bart and Eugène Polyakov, after Jean Coralli and Jules Perrot): Count Albrecht
Coppélia (choreography: Pierre Lacotte, after Arthur Saint-Léon): Frantz
Paquita (choreography: Pierre Lacotte, after Marius Petipa): Lucien d’Hervilly
Don Quixote (choreography: Rudolf Nureyev, after Marius Petipa and Alexander Gorsky): Basilio
The Sleeping Beauty (choreography: Rudolf Nureyev, after Marius Petipa): Prince Désiré
Swan Lake (choreography: Rudolf Nureyev, after Marius Petipa and Lev Ivanov): Prince Siegfried
The Nutcracker (choreography: Rudolf Nureyev): Drosselmeyer/Prince
La Fille mal gardée (choreography: Frederick Ashton): Colas
Onegin (choreography: John Cranko): title role
Manon (choreography: Kenneth MacMillan): Des Grieux
The Lady of the Camellias (choreography: John Neumeier): Armand Duval
Proust, ou Les intermittences du coeur (choreography: Roland Petit): Saint-Loup (first interpreter at the Paris Opera Ballet)
Ivan the Terrible (choreography: Yuri Grigorovich): Prince Kurbsky
Romeo and Juliet (choreography: Rudolf Nureyev): Romeo 
Cinderella (choreography: Rudolf Nureyev): Movie Star
La Petite danseuse de Degas (choreography: Patrice Bart): Ballet Master
Caligula (choreography: Nicolas Le Riche): title role
Les Enfants du paradis (choreography: José Martinez): Baptiste (first interpreter)
Psyche (choreography: Alexei Ratmansky): Eros
Daphnis and Chloe (choreography: Benjamin Millepied): Daphnis
Apollo (choreography: George Balanchine): title role
The Four Temperaments (choreography: George Balanchine): Phlegmatic
Palais de Cristal (choreography: George Balanchine): First Movement soloist
Symphony in C (choreography: George Balanchine): First Movement soloist
La Valse (choreography: George Balanchine)
Agon (choreography: George Balanchine): first pas de trois
Brahms-Schoenberg Quartet (choreography: George Balanchine): First Movement soloist
Jewels (choreography: George Balanchine): Emeralds, Diamonds
Mozartiana (choreography: George Balanchine)
Suite en Blanc (choreography: Serge Lifar): Thème varié, Mazurka, Adage
Études (choreography: Harald Lander)
Dances at a Gathering (choreography: Jerome Robbins): Man in Brown, Man in Green
In the Night (choreography: Jerome Robbins): Second pas de deux
The Goldberg Variations (choreography: Jerome Robbins): Second Couple
Other Dances (choreography: Jerome Robbins)
Opus 19/The Dreamer (choreography: Jerome Robbins)
The Firebird (choreography: Maurice Béjart): title role
Serait-ce la mort? (choreography: Maurice Béjart): The Man
Yondering (choreography: John Neumeier)
The Third Symphony of Gustav Mahler (choreography: John Neumeier): The Man
Song of the Earth (choreography: John Neumeier; world premiere)
Artifact Suite (choreography: William Forsythe)
Approximate Sonata (choreography: William Fosythe; first interpreter at the Paris Opera Ballet)
Woundwork 1 (choreography: William Forsythe)
Amoveo (choreography: Benjamin Millepied)
Genus (choreography: Wayne McGregor; world premiere)
Alea Sands (choreography: Wayne McGregor; world premiere)
Grand miroir (choreography: Saburo Teshigawara; world premiere)
Dogs Sleep (choreography: Marco Goecke; world premiere)

Filmography
Coppélia (choreography: Pierre Lacotte), Paris Opera Ballet School, 2001: as Frantz
La Sylphide (choreography: Pierre Lacotte), Paris Opera Ballet, 2004: as James
Jewels (choreography: George Balanchine), Paris Opera Ballet, 2005: in 'Emeralds'
Proust (choreography: Roland Petit), Paris Opera Ballet, 2007: as Saint-Loup
Comme un rêve (documentary directed by Marlène Ionesco), 2009
La Danse (documentary directed by Frederick Wiseman), 2009
La Petite danseuse de Degas (choreography: Patrice Bart), 2010: as the Ballet Master
Les Enfants du paradis (choreography: José Martinez), 2011: as Baptiste
'Célébration' (choreography: Pierre Lacotte), Paris Opera Ballet, 2013
The Sleeping Beauty (choreography: Rudolf Nureyev), Paris Opera Ballet, 2013: as Prince Désiré
Palais de Cristal (choreography: George Balanchine), Paris Opera Ballet, 2014: as the First Movement soloist
Dances at a Gathering (choreography: Jerome Robbins), Paris Opera Ballet, 2014: as the Man in Brown
Giselle (choreography: Konstantin Sergeyev), Mariinsky Ballet, 2016: as Count Albrecht
Swan Lake (choreography: Rudolf Nureyev), Paris Opera Ballet, 2016: as Prince Siegfried
Giselle (choreography: Patrice Bart and Eugène Polyakov), Paris Opera Ballet, 2020: as Count Albrecht

References

External links
Mathieu Ganio's page on the website of the Paris Opera
Archive of Ganio's performances at the Paris Opera

Living people
1984 births
French male ballet dancers
Ganio
Prix Benois de la Danse winners